Aurora is a Ukrainian film by Oksana Bairak. It was premiered on November 30, 2006.

Plot
The film is about a little girl named Aurora who suffered as a result of the Chernobyl disaster of 1986. Aurora is taken to the United States where she is supposed to get surgery. She meets a man with a ruined life and helps him become a refined character.

Cast
 Nastya Zyurkalova as Aurora
 Dmitry Kharatyan  as Nik Astakhov
 Eric Roberts as Mr. Brown
 Anastasiya Meskova as Margo
 Anastasiya Bunina as Natalya
 Varvara Filipchuk
 Vlad Gerasimov
 Vladimir Goryanskiy
 Yekaterina Kachan
 Sergey Malyuga
 Oleg Maslennikov
 Irina Pogulyay
 Natalya Natalushko
 Stanislava Khomenko
 Dima Martimyanov
 Alla Maslennikova
 Yelena Petrashko
 Larisa Pretorius

Awards
The film was nominated as Ukraine's entry for an Oscar as Best Foreign Language Film.

In 2007 and 2008, the main music theme of the movie, also called  Aurora, was used by the Ukrainian rhythmic gymnast Anna Bessonova for her hoop routine, which was applauded well.

See also
 List of submissions to the 79th Academy Awards for Best Foreign Language Film
 List of Ukrainian submissions for the Academy Award for Best Foreign Language Film

References

External links 
 
 
 Avrora Trailer

English-language Ukrainian films
2006 films
Ukrainian drama films
2006 drama films